Statistics of the Scottish Football League in season 1923–24.

Scottish League Division One

Scottish League Division Two

Scottish League Division Three

 
Scottish Football League seasons